The 2008–09 Dayton Flyers men's basketball team represented the University of Dayton during the 2008–09 NCAA Division I men's basketball season. The Flyers, led by sixth year head coach Brian Gregory, played their home games at the University of Dayton Arena and were members of the Atlantic 10 Conference. They finished the season 27–8, 11–5 in A-10 play for a tie for second-place. They received an at-large bid to the NCAA tournament where they defeated West Virginia in the round of 64 before losing in the round of 32 to defending national champion Kansas. The Flyers first round win was the program's first in the NCAA Tournament since 1990, when they defeated Illinois in the round of 64.

Previous season
The 2007–08 Dayton Flyers finished the season with an overall record of 23–11, with a record of 8–8 in the Atlantic 10 regular season for a tie for a fifth-place finish. They received an at-large bid to the 2008 National Invitation Tournament where they beat Cleveland State and Illinois State in the first and second rounds before falling to eventual champion Ohio State in the quarterfinals.

Offseason

Departures

Incoming transfers

Incoming recruits

Roster

Schedule

|-
!colspan=9 style="background:#C40023; color:#75B2DD;"| Exhibition

|-
!colspan=9 style="background:#C40023; color:#75B2DD;"| Non-conference regular season

|-
!colspan=9 style="background:#C40023; color:#75B2DD;"| Atlantic 10 regular season

|-
!colspan=9 style="background:#C40023; color:#75B2DD;"| Atlantic 10 tournament

|-
!colspan=9 style="background:#C40023; color:#75B2DD;"| NCAA tournament

References

Dayton Flyers men's basketball seasons
Dayton
Dayton
Dayton
Dayton